The Northern Ireland Commissioner for Children and Young People (NICCY) is a publicly funded post, with responsibility for protecting children's rights as set out in the Convention on the Rights of the Child. Nigel Williams was the Commissioner from its introduction in 2003 until his death in 2006.

In day-to-day operation, the Commissioner is independent and free to determine his/her own priorities according to a number of guiding principles chief of which is a requirement that the rights of the child must be the Commissioner's paramount consideration; but also including, for example, a requirement to have regard to the role of parents. The remit includes the full spectrum of public authorities whose activities affect children and young people – including those operating in the non-devolved field, such as juvenile justice agencies, also to investigate complaints from individuals in particular circumstances.

Commissioners
 Nigel Williams (2003 to 2006)
 Patricia Lewsley (2007 to 2015)
 Koulla Yiasouma (since 2015)

See also 
Children's Commissioner for England
Children's Commissioner for Wales
Northern Ireland Public Services Ombudsman
Scotland's Commissioner for Children and Young People
Ombudsman for Children, Ireland 
Timeline of young people's rights in the United Kingdom

References

External links
Children's Commissioner Website

Commissioner For Children And Young People, Northern Ireland
Children's rights authorities
Children's rights in the United Kingdom
Commissioner For Children And Young People, Northern Ireland
Commissioner For Children And Young People, Northern Ireland
Government agencies established in 2003
Children's ombudsman posts